The Frank Baronetcy, of Withyham in the County of Sussex, is a title in the Baronetage of the United Kingdom. It was created on 19 June 1920 for the estate agent and public servant Howard Frank. He was a senior partner in the firm of Knight, Frank and Rutland, and served as Director-General of Lands to the War Office, Air Ministry and Ministry of Munitions from 1917 to 1922.

Frank baronets, of Withyham (1920)
Sir Howard George Frank, 1st Baronet (1871–1932)
Sir Howard Frederick Frank, 2nd Baronet (1923–1944)
Sir Robert John Frank, 3rd Baronet (1925–1987)
Sir Robert Andrew Frank, 4th Baronet (born 1964)

There is no heir to the baronetcy.

References

Kidd, Charles, Williamson, David (editors). Debrett's Peerage and Baronetage (1990 edition). New York: St Martin's Press, 1990.

Frank